Highwood Pass is a mountain pass in Kananaskis Country, Alberta, Canada. It lies west of Mount Rae and Mount Arethusa of the Misty Range, south of the Elbow Pass. It lies within the Peter Lougheed Provincial Park on Alberta Highway 40. The Highwood River originates in the pass.

Kananaskis Trail runs through the pass, and offers access to a multitude of camping grounds and recreational areas.

Tourism 
Highwood Pass is the highest paved pass in Canada. The pass is closed each year from December 1 to June 14 due to very high snowfall and to protect wildlife. For a small portion of June, the snow is melted but the road remains closed, making this a popular destination for road cyclists. During the summer, it is popular among drivers as well, said to be one of the most scenic drives in Canada.

References

External links
Peakfinder. Highwood Pass

Kananaskis Improvement District
Mountain passes of Alberta